The Eiao Nature Reserve is a nature reserve encompassing the whole of the island of Eiao in the northern Marquesas Islands, as well as several surrounding rocks.  The reserve was declared in 1971, as a first step in preserving whatever remains of the devastated ecosystem, which has almost entirely been destroyed through over-grazing by feral goats, sheep and swine.

The reserve is the primary nesting site of several endangered species, several of which are endemic, including the Eiao Marquesan warbler (Acrocephalus mendanae aquilonis) and the Iphis monarch (Pomarea iphis).

See also
French Polynesia
Marquesan Nature Reserves

References

Environment of the Marquesas Islands
Nature reserves